The 1937 UK & Ireland Greyhound Racing Year was the 12th year of greyhound racing in the United Kingdom and Ireland.

Roll of honour

Summary
The industry showed no sign of a slow down, with attendances at UK tracks surpassing twenty million for the sixth year in succession. The leading company, the Greyhound Racing Association (GRA) increased profits again. The operating profit for 1937 was £241,000 (a substantial figure at the time) and attendances at GRA tracks increased slightly to  3,849,513. The GRA also took a controlling interest in New Cross Stadium and boasted that they had the largest totalisator in the world at White City, with 634 issuing machines. Wattle Bark won the 1937 English Greyhound Derby defeating 1936 star Shove Halfpenny into second place.

Tracks
Just five known tracks opened but Crayford & Bexleyheath Stadium underwent a significant £50,000 renovation, with no provision made for speedway.

Tracks opened

Competitions
London based trainers monopolised the main races and the names of Sidney Orton at Wimbledon, Jim Syder Sr. at Wembley, Stanley Biss at West Ham and the Hook kennels trainers Leslie Reynolds, Joe Harmon and Jack Harvey all became household names.

An attempt by Derby champion Fine Jubilee to win the Gold Collar failed as he was beaten three quarters in the final by Avion Ballerina. He had won his semi-final by breaking the track record, recording 25.42 and finishing eleven lengths clear of second placed Hetton Sea Eagle. Just six days later Oaks champion Genial Radiance now trained privately by J W Day was victorious in the Welsh Greyhound Derby. The Scurry Gold Cup was held in July with many of the Derby participants taking part at Clapton Stadium, in a very competitive final Hexham Bridge came out on top in a race that included Curleys Fancy II and Avion Ballerina. Hexham Bridge had remained unbeaten throughout the competition.

Jesmond Cutlet claimed the Scottish Greyhound Derby and Ballyhennessy Sandills won the Laurels. The two competitions clashed, as did the Oaks and St Leger in September; the calendar required better organisation. Brave Queen won the 1937 Oaks, a race that was a little shambolic following the withdrawal of three runners. A top class field assembled for the St Leger, a competition won by Grosvenor Bob, continuing a great year for trainer Jim Syder. Top of the Carlow Road and Maidens Delight finished fourth and fifth respectively in the final. Jesmond Cutlet completed a fine year by defeating great rival Grosvenor Bob in the Cesarewitch which was now held in December.

The White City invitation race was held on 6 November and carried a winner's prize of £2,000, remarkably £750 more than the Derby itself. Laurels champion Ballyhennessy Sandills took the honours. The second prize offered was £1,000 and went to Wily Captain and the previous year's winner Safe Rock picked up £500 for finishing third.

Ireland
Markets Field in Limerick finally opened to greyhound racing following a long delay. Clonmel Greyhound Stadium record holder Monarch Of All was sold for the record price of 350 guineas at the Harold's Cross Stadium sales.

Muinessa won the 1937 Irish Greyhound Derby.

News
Romford Greyhound Stadium owner Archer Leggett initiated a bizarre idea to introduce cheetah racing to the UK. Twelve cheetahs arrived from Kenya in December 1936 courtesy of explorer Kenneth Gandar-Dower. After six months of quarantine the cheetahs were given time to acclimatise before Romford, Harringay and Staines were earmarked for the experiment with the cheetahs running for the first time on Saturday 11 December 1937 at Romford. The experiment failed, with just one further race held; the racing stopped because although the cheetahs were able to better the greyhound times they had to be let off first when racing greyhounds and when they raced against each other they became disinterested and stopped chasing the lure.

Fourteen year old George Curtis secured a job with Portsmouth Stadium trainer Bill Peters.

Principal UK races

References 

Greyhound racing in the United Kingdom
Greyhound racing in the Republic of Ireland
1937 in British sport
1937 in Irish sport
1937 in Welsh sport
1937 in Scottish sport